Katharine Victoria Winks (born 16 March 1978) is a former international cricketer who represented England in seven One Day Internationals. Domestically she played primarily for West of England and Somerset. She was a right-arm medium bowler and left-handed batter.

Early life

Winks was born on 16 March 1978 in Bristol, England.

Domestic career

Winks played for West of England in the Women's Area Championship and latterly the Women's County Championship between 1992 and 1999. After West of England were abolished, she played for Somerset in 2000. She also made four appearances for Midwest Women, including three in the Women's Territorial Tournament and one tourist match against New Zealand.

International career

Winks appeared for various England youth teams including Junior England, England Under-20s, England Under-21s and England Under-23s before making her senior debut in a One Day International against Australia at Hove on 18 July 1998. She bowled two overs for 10 runs and scored 2 runs before being run out. In total she played in seven One Day Internationals, with her final appearance coming against Australia at Bradman Oval, Bowral on 1 February 2000. In total she took two wickets at an average of 60 runs.

References

External links 
 

1978 births
Living people
England women One Day International cricketers
Somerset women cricketers